Alexandria Town (born July 6, 1995) is a Canadian freestyle wrestler, competing in the 57kg weight class. In November 2018, Alex became the first ever Canadian to win a gold medal at the U23 World Championships. She has also secured Canada a place at the 2019 Pan Am Games by winning the bronze medal at 2018 Pan American Wrestling Championships.

In March 2020 she won the women's 59 kg title at the 2020 Pan American Wrestling Championships in Ottawa, Canada, followed by a silver medal in the 57 kg division at the 2021 Pan American Wrestling Championships in Guatemala City, Guatemala.

In October 2021, she was eliminated in her first match in the women's 57 kg event at the 2021 World Wrestling Championships in Oslo, Norway.

She won a bronze medal in her event at the 2022 Pan American Wrestling Championships held in Acapulco, Mexico, making her a 4x Pan American medalist.

She won the gold medal in her event at the 2023 Ibrahim Moustafa Tournament held in Alexandria, Egypt.

International matches

References

1995 births
Living people
Canadian female sport wrestlers
Sportspeople from Scarborough, Toronto
York University alumni
Pan American Wrestling Championships medalists
21st-century Canadian women